Ilka is a feminine given name. Notable people with the given name include:

Ilka Agricola (born 1973), German mathematician
Ilka Bessin (born 1971), German comedian and actress
Ilka Chase (1905–1978), American actress and novelist
Ilka Gedő (1921–1985), Jewish Hungarian artist
Ilka Grüning (1876–1964), Jewish actress forced to flee Europe when the Nazis came to power in 1933
Ilka Pálmay (1859–1945), born Ilona Petráss, a Hungarian-born singer and actress
Ilka Semmler (born 1985), German beach volleyball player
Ilka Soares (1932–2022), Brazilian actress
Ilka Stitz (born 1960), German writer
Ilka Štuhec (born 1990), Slovenian alpine ski racer
Ilka Tanya Payán (1943–1996), Dominican actress and attorney who later became a prominent AIDS/HIV activist in the United States
Ilka Van de Vyver (born 1993), Belgian volleyball player
Ilka White, Australian artist

Feminine given names